Navarro Independent School District (NISD) is a public school district based in the community of Geronimo, Texas (USA).

In 2009, the school district was rated "academically acceptable" by the Texas Education Agency.

Schools
Navarro High (Grades 9–12)
Navarro Junior High (Grades 7–8)
Navarro Intermediate (Grades 4–6)
Navarro Elementary (Grades PK-3)

After much debate and several rounds of voting (mainly about funding), NISD approved the building of a new high school in order to cope with the growing number of students.  This new high school first officially welcomed students in the fall of the 2006 school year.

NISD is housed on four campuses (High School, Junior High, Intermediate, and Elementary). The new high school building was built on what was originally the baseball field, thus causing a new baseball field to be built next to the already existing softball field. The current junior high has taken residence in the former high school building, which many years earlier had housed all the campuses. The past intermediate school resided in the former middle school, which when first built, housed the elementary. Since then a new intermediate school has been built.

Their school mascot is a Panther. School colors are purple and gold.

Members of The Navarro ISD School Board 

 President: Renee Rehfeld 
 Vice President: Hank Dietert
 Secretary: Donna Gilliam
 Assistant Secretary: Clint Scheib
 Members: Tracy Large, Melissa Sartain, Brian Sheffler

References

External links
 
 Erwin Lee Field- Navarro ISD – TexasBob.com

School districts in Guadalupe County, Texas